Feferman–Vaught theorem  in model theory is a theorem by Solomon Feferman and Robert Lawson Vaught that shows how to reduce, in an algorithmic way, the first-order theory of a product of first-order structures to the first-order theory of elements of the structure.

The theorem is considered as one of the standard results in model theory. The theorem extends the previous result of Andrzej Mostowski on direct products of theories.
It generalizes (to formulas with arbitrary quantifiers) the property in universal algebra that equalities (identities) carry over to direct products of algebraic structures (which is a consequence of one direction of Birkhoff's theorem).

Direct product of structures 

Consider a first-order logic signature L.
, which is also an L-structure, with all functions and relations defined pointwise.

The definition generalizes direct product in universal algebra to relational first-order structures, which contain not only function symbols but also relation symbols. 

When  is a functional relation, this definition reduces to the definition of direct product in universal algebra.

Statement of the theorem for direct products 

For a first-order logic formula  in signature L with free variables, and for an interpretation  of the variables , we define the set of indices  for which  holds in 

Given a first-order formula with free variables , there is an algorithm to compute its equivalent game normal form, which is a finite disjunction  of mutually contradictory formulas.

The Feferman-Vaught theorem gives an algorithm that takes a first-order formula  and constructs a formula  that reduces the condition that  holds in the product to the condition that  holds in the interpretation of  sets of indices:

Formula  is thus a formula with  free set variables, for example, in the first-order theory of Boolean algebra of sets.

Proof idea 

Formula  can be constructed following the structure of the starting formula . When  is quantifier free then, by definition of direct product above it follows 

Consequently, we can take  to be the equality  in the language of boolean algebra of sets (equivalently, the field of sets). 

Generalized products 

It is often of interest to consider substructure of the direct product structure. If the restriction that defines product elements that belong to the substructure can be expressed as a condition on the sets of index elements, then the results can be generalized. 

An example is the substructure of product elements that are constant at all but finitely many indices. Assume that the language L contains a constant symbol  and consider the substructure containing only those product elements  for which the set

is finite. The theorem then reduces the truth value in such substructure to a formula  in the boolean algebra of sets, where certain sets are restricted to be finite.

One way to define generalized products is to consider those
substructures where the sets  belong to some boolean algebra  of sets  of indices (a subset of the powerset set algebra ), and where the product substructure admits gluing.

Consequences 

Feferman-Vaught theorem implies the decidability of Skolem arithmetic by viewing, via fundamental theorem of arithmetic, the structure natural numbers with multiplication as a generalized product (power) of Presburger arithmetic structures.

Model theory

References